Ho West District is one of the eighteen districts in Volta Region, Ghana.  Originally it was formerly part of the then-larger Ho District on 10 March 1989, until the western part was split off to create Ho West District on 28 June 2012; thus the remaining part was elevated to municipal district assembly status on that same year to become Ho Municipal District. The district assembly is located in the central part of Volta Region and has Dzolokpuita as its capital town.

Plans are already underway to split the Ho West District, due to slow development, large size and extreme length, stretching several kilometers from the north of the North Tongu District to the northern part of the Afadzato South District

Administration
Ho West District covers the same area as the Ho West Constituency.

Boundaries
The North Tongu District is to the south of the Ho West District and the Asuogyaman District to the south west. To the north is the Afadzato South District. The Ho Municipality, Adaklu District and the Republic of Togo are east of the district and the South Dayi District to the west.

Miscellaneous information
It thrives primarily on Agriculture and the sales of these produces, Ho West has a large stretch of fertile Agricultural land favorable for the production of food crops like roots and tubers, cereals (rice, maizes etc.) vegetables and legumes. The land is also favorable for the large scale production of Cocoa, hence the establishment of COCOBOD seed production center at Saviefe-Agorkpo to provide improved cocoa seedlings to farmers within its catchment area. Ho West also has a number of markets in almost all the villages and the local District Assembly is making efforts to develop these markets to improve on the living standards of the people and improve its own revenue generation. Health of the people is of great importance hence the establishment of Community Health Improvement Services (CHIPS) centers. The district also have community health centers in Abutia, Hlefi, Dzolo Kpuita, Dzolo Gborgame, Vane, Kpedze etc. There is a well equipped Clinic at Saviefe-Agorkpo, which was established by the Catholic Diocese of Ho with funding from a German charity organisation. There is also a government established clinic in Tsito.
Ho West has numerous basic schools and about eight government assisted senior high/technical schools.

Towns and villages
The following is a list of towns and villages found in the district.

External links

References

Districts of Volta Region

States and territories established in 2012